Vintage Years may refer to:

Vintage Years (Fleetwood Mac album), 1975
Vintage Years (Jo Stafford album)